Miloslav Švandrlík (10 August 1932 – 26 October 2009) was a Czech writer and humourist. He also used the pseudonym Roman Kefalín.

Life and work

Miloslav Švandrlík was born in Prague, Czechoslovakia, in 1932. After finishing secondary school, Švandrlík took a number of jobs and also completed a two-year teaching course at a music college in Prague. Subsequently in 1950, he obtained his matura diploma. Between 1951 and 1953, he studied at the Faculty of Theatre in Prague, but left after two years.

He joined the Auxiliary Technical Unit of the Czechoslovakian army (compulsory at the time) in October 1953. He left in the winter of 1955, and worked as a teaching assistant for Korean children in Liběšice before becoming a professional writer. Most of his work was humorous and satirical, but he is also known for his science fiction and children's books.

One of his most famous books, titled Černí baroni (Černí Baroni aneb Válčili jsme za Čepičky), is based on stories from the time he served in the military service. It portrays the irony and absurdity of life under Communism. The novel was adapted to film in 1992 under the title Černí baroni.

In his written work, he often cooperated with Jiří Winter Neprakta, mostly coming up with texts for Winter's drafted jokes. He also wrote a number of screenplays and radio plays.

Selected publications

 Z chlévů i bulvárů (1960)
 Krvavý Bill viola (1961)
 Od Šumavy k Popokatepetlu (1962)
 Kovbojská romance (1964)
 Hrdinové a jiní podivíni (1969)
 Drakulův švagr (1970)
 Mořský vlk a veselá vdova aneb Proti všem (1970)
 Neuvěřitelné příhody žáků Kopyta a Mňouka (1973)
 Žáci Kopyto a Mňouk a mimozemšťané
 Žáci Kopyto a Mňouk opět zasahují
 Žáci Kopyto a Mňouk a lesní netvor
 Žáci Kopyto a Mňouk a stříbrňáci
 Žáci Kopyto a Mňouk v jihlavských katakombách
 Žáci Kopyto a Mňouk a černá magie
 Žáci Kopyto a Mňouk, postrach Posázaví
 Žáci Kopyto a Mňouk na stopě
 Žáci Kopyto a Mňouk a náměsíčníci
 Žáci Kopyto a Mňouk a maharadžova pomsta
 Žáci Kopyto a Mňouk a akta X
 Žáci Kopyto a Mňouk a ryšavý upír
 Doktor od jezera Hrochů (1980)
 Dívka na vdávání (1983)
 Muž, který se topil (1985)
 Šance jako hrom (1989)
 Vražda mlsného humoristy (1990)
 Černí baroni aneb Válčili jsme za Čepičky (1990)
 Ještě máme co jsme chtěli (1991)
 Starosti korunovaných hlav (1992)
 Na nebožtíka vypadáte skvěle (1992)
 Sexbomba na doplňkovou půjčku (1994)
 Blanka oběť sexuálního harašení (2004)

After 1990, Švandrlík wrote a number of books that continued the story begun in Černí baroni:
 Říkali mu Terazky aneb šest půllitrů u Jelínků (1991)
 Lásky Černého barona (1991)
 Kam to kráčíš, Kefalíne?
 Pět sekyr poručíka Hamáčka (1993)
 Černý baron od Botiče (1993)
 Černí baroni po čtyřiceti letech (1998)
 Růžové sny pilného hňupa aneb Poručíme větru, dešti (1999)
 Černí baroni těsně před kremací (1999)
 Stoletý major Terazky (2000)
 Terazky na hrad (2002)
 Terazkyho poslední džob (2002)
 Terazky v tunelu doktora Moodyho (2003)
 Nesmiřitelný Terazky (2003)
 Černí baroni útočí na obrazovku (2003)

Honours and awards

A few days before his death in 2009, Švandrlík became an honorary citizen of Prague 11.

On 21 April 2010, a field bordered by Skřivanova, Lažanského, Švabinského, and 7. května streets in Chodov was named after the writer. A bust of Švandrlík by Czech artist  was unveiled there on 14 October 2010.

Bibliography

References

Writers from Prague
Czech novelists
Czech children's writers
1932 births
2009 deaths